Magdalina Stancheva (7 September 1924 – 6 October 2014) was a Bulgarian archaeologist and museologist, recognized for her dedication in preserving Sofia's past. As one of the first museologists in the country, she influenced and taught many the scientific principals of conservation. She worked with both the International Council of Museums and UNESCO to designate national preservation sites and was recognized by many awards for her efforts in conserving the cultural history of the country, including the Order of Saints Cyril and Methodius, the National Order Of Labour, and a citation as an Honorary Citizen of Sofia.

Early life
Magdalina Mihailova Stancheva was born on 7 September 1924 in Sofia, Bulgaria. She completed her secondary education at First Girls' High School in Sofia and the enrolled at the University of Sofia "St. Kliment Ohridski". During her schooling, she participated in rescue archaeology projects in the city center of Sofia, which was being rebuilt after bombings from World War II. She graduated in 1948 with a degree in classical philology and history.

Career
In 1951, Stancheva was hired to work in the Sofia Municipal Museum and simultaneously to work on archaeologic projects of the facility. She proposed that the name be changed to the Historical Museum of Sofia, now known as the Sofia Regional Historical Museum, in 1952, and with the name change, she was hired as the senior curator. The following year she was appointed as head of the archaeology department of the museum. She also led excavations and participated in archaeological surveys of Sofia and throughout the country.

From the 1950s through the 1970s, Stancheva led the effort to preserve archaeological sites, through efforts to have them declared as heritage preservation locations. Working with the International Council of Museums and UNESCO, she presented successful candidacies for such projects as the Boyana Church, the Rila Monastery, and the Thracian Tomb of Kazanlak to receive recognition as cultural monuments to be preserved and protected. Writing articles on the history and archaeology of Sofia, conservation, the conflicts between the need to urbanize and the need to preserve history, Stancheva published over 600 titles in various languages about Bulgarian and Thracian history. She published for the Bulgarian Academy of Sciences and the Bulgarian Historical Society in such volumes as Announcements of the Archaeological Institute", Announcements of the Bulgarian Historical Society, Archeology, Museums and Monuments of Culture Magazine and Sofia Magazine, among others.

In the early 1970s, Stancheva was appointed as a Bulgarian delegate to the International Council of Museums of Paris and the UNESCO World Cultural Heritage Committee. She served as vice president on the committee for six years and broadcast cultural programs on both Radio Sofia and Radio UNESCO to provide cultural education. She was awarded the Order of Saints Cyril and Methodius in both grades I and II for her preservation efforts, as well as being honored with the National Order Of Labour, Silver Class for her years of service, among many other awards. In 1985 Stancheva left the museum and active work as an archaeologist and began working as a voluntary consultant to the legislature and Ministry of Culture on legal protections for cultural heritage. She also taught at Sofia University as well as at the National Academy of Arts and the New Bulgarian University, training dozens of museologists from throughout the country.

Stancheva's position on archaeology was founded in scientific evidence. She participated in two commissions over the question of whether Vasil Levski's grave had been found at St. Petka's and maintained the position that without proof, linking a person or event to a place, undermined the authority of historians and archaeologists. Nikolai Khaitov, a popular writer, accused Stancheva of participating in a conspiracy to prevent investigation into  Levski's burial site and accused her publicly of mishandling the remains. She flatly denied that there was any attempt to hide the bones and maintained that when the skeleton labeled "No. 95" arrived at the museum, it was sent, as all other bones were, to Petîr Boev at the Archaeological Institute for examination. As the bones were lost, the commissions held that no substantive identification could be made.

In 1990, Stancheva designed a Cultural Heritage program for the New Bulgarian University and taught the courses in the program until 2004. After she retired from teaching, she continued researching and published two books, София: От древността до нови времена (Sofia: From antiquity to new times, 2009) and Мадарският конник'' (Madara Horseman, 2013). She was unanimously designated as an honorary citizen of Sofia for her life's work in 2010.

Death and legacy
Stancheva died on 6 October 2014 in Sofia. Her personal papers, including books and documents from international congresses on archaeology and conservation were donated to the New Bulgarian University Library in 1997. She is known for having popularized preservation in Sofia and for her

Selected works

References

Citations

Bibliography

1924 births
2014 deaths
Sofia University alumni
Academic staff of Sofia University
Museologists
Bulgarian women archaeologists
Bulgarian archaeologists
20th-century archaeologists
21st-century archaeologists
21st-century Bulgarian women writers
20th-century Bulgarian women writers